Heart and Guts is a 1982 Brazilian comedy film directed by Ana Carolina. It was screened in the Un Certain Regard section at the 1982 Cannes Film Festival.

Plot
A boarding school only for girls is decreed to be closed by the state. An intervenor, Guido (Antônio Fagundes), is sent to the school to sign the protocol to confirm its closure and says it will become a corporation. Unexpectedly the students start to have sex, as well as the janitors and truancy officers. Meanwhile, each of the two principals, Renata (Dina Sfat) and Miriam (Xuxa Lopes), create obstacles to the other as both want Guido exclusively for herself. In the end, however, Guido finds out everything was just a dream and confirms the school's closure.

Cast
 Antônio Fagundes as Guido
 Dina Sfat as Renata
 Xuxa Lopes as Miriam
 Ney Latorraca as priest
 Christiane Torloni as teacher
 Eduardo Tornaghi
 Othon Bastos
 Cristina Pereira as Amindra
 Myrian Muniz as Muniza
 Nair Bello as Nair

References

External links

1982 comedy films
1982 films
1980s Portuguese-language films
Brazilian comedy films
Films directed by Ana Carolina